Edmond Donzé (15 March 1899 – 13 December 1966) was a Swiss weightlifter. He competed in the men's light heavyweight event at the 1928 Summer Olympics.

References

External links
 

1899 births
1966 deaths
Swiss male weightlifters
Olympic weightlifters of Switzerland
Weightlifters at the 1928 Summer Olympics
Place of birth missing